ASD most often refers to:
 Autism spectrum disorder, a neurodevelopmental condition
 Acute stress disorder, a psychological response

ASD may also refer to:

In science and technology

Biology
 ASD (database), an online directory of allosteric proteins and their structure
 Asd RNA motif, a structure in lactic-acid bacterium ribonucleic acid
 Aspartate-semialdehyde dehydrogenase, an amino-acid-synthesising enzyme in plants, fungi and bacteria

Medicine
 Antiseizure drug, an epilepsy medication
 Antiseptic Dorogov's Stimulator, a Russian topical veterinary drug
 Arthroscopic subacromial decompression, a surgical procedure on the shoulder
 Atrial septal defect, a congenital heart defect

Computing
 Accredited Symbian Developer, a computer programming qualification
 Adaptive software development, a software development process
 Aircraft and Scenery Designer, an add-on for the Microsoft Flight Simulator 4.0 video game
 Andromeda Software Development, a Greek audio-visual demogroup

 Application Specific Device, a Wi-Fi certification type

Other uses in science and technology

 Adjustable-speed drive, of an electric motor
 Allowable stress design, a structural design methodology
 Aspirating smoke detector, an indoor fire-protection device

Transport
 Aeronautical Systems Division (1961-1992), US Air Force technical division
 Air Sinai, by ICAO code
 Amsterdam Centraal railway station, station code
 Andros Town International Airport, by IATA code
 Slidell Airport, by FAA LID

Education

United States
 Academy for Science and Design, Nashua, New Hampshire
 Alabama School for the Deaf, part of the Alabama Institute for Deaf and Blind
 Allentown School District, Pennsylvania
 American School for the Deaf, West Hartford, Connecticut
 Anchorage School District, Alaska
 Armstrong School District (Pennsylvania)
 Ashland School District (Oregon)
 Avondale School District, Auburn Hills, Michigan

Other places
 American School of Doha, Qatar
 American School of Douala, Cameroon
 American School of Dubai

Government and politics
 AeroSpace and Defence Industries Association of Europe, a European business association
 Alliance for Securing Democracy, a trans-Atlantic group
 Alliance for Social Democracy, a political party in Benin
 Architectural Services Department, Hong Kong
 Australian Signals Directorate, intelligence agency
 United States Assistant Secretary of Defense, one of several senior US Department of Defense officials

Other uses
 ASD (album), 2015, by A Skylit Drive, an American band
 Asas language, by its ISO 639 code
 A. S. Byatt (born 1936), English critic, novelist, poet and short story writer, who was born Antonia Susan Drabble and whose married name is Antonia Susan Duffy

See also